The Battle of Calamba was a battle fought between Filipino Revolutionaries in Laguna in the Philippines and the colonial forces of the Spanish Empire.

Background 
Emilio Aguinaldo had returned from exile in Hong Kong and was amassing a large force to drive out the Spanish from Cavite. General Leopoldo Garcia Peña, the Spanish military commander at Cavite, was hard-pressed with roughly 3,000 Spanish troops scattered in various detachments in Cavite. The combined forces of Generals Luciano San Miguel, Mariano Noriel, Artemio Ricarte and Juan Cailles, having with them about 6,000–8,000 troops, who began attacking and decimating Peña's units one by one. With the war of liberation once again in full swing, Laguna was soon also subsumed by waves of revolutionary fervor, and surely enough rebel armies were quickly formed in an effort to liberate the province from Spanish control. One of such forces was led by General Paciano Rizal, brother of political activist and writer Jose Rizal, with his command of 400 men-at-arms.

Battle 
Initially, the Spanish garrison in Calamba, numbering to 60 riflemen, holed up in the town church. They chose to wait as the Filipinos besieged the church. Lacking guns, and lacking even more ammunition, Rizal devised a ploy to get the Spaniards to surrender, he ordered that every time the Filipino column opened fire on the church, other troops, those without guns, would light up firecrackers to create the illusion that the Filipinos had plenty of guns. This fooled the Spanish detachment, and as a result surrendered shortly thereafter.

Aftermath 
With the surrender of the Spanish detachment at Calamba, Paciano Rizal had a free hand to head with his force to Santa Cruz, capital of Laguna and by then the last town still under Spanish control, joining with other commanders present there.

References

External links 
CDAO Imus Cavite
http://philippine-revolution.110mb.com/

Battles of the Philippine Revolution
History of Laguna (province)
Calamba, Laguna